The 2019–20 Maryland Terrapins women's basketball team represent the University of Maryland, College Park in 2019–20 NCAA Division I women's basketball season. The Terrapins, led by eighteenth year head coach Brenda Frese, played their home games at the Xfinity Center as members of the Big Ten Conference.

Roster

Recruits

Awards and honors

Schedule and results

|-
!colspan=9 style=| Exhibition

|-
!colspan=9 style=| Non-conference regular season

|-
!colspan=9 style=| Big Ten regular season

|-
!colspan=9 style=| Big Ten Women's Tournament

Rankings
2019–20 NCAA Division I women's basketball rankings

See also
2019–20 Maryland Terrapins men's basketball team

References

External links
 Official Team Website

Maryland Terrapins women's basketball seasons
Maryland
Maryland
Maryland